Siam Shade was a five-piece Japanese rock band which broke onto the visual kei scene alongside a multitude of other artists in the early 1990s. They released five studio albums, sixteen singles and ten video albums. After disbanding in 2002 there had been released seven compilation albums.

Studio albums

Compilation albums

Tribute albums

Singles

Video albums

 Siam Shade (VHS: March 1, 1997, DVD: December 6, 2000)
 Siam Shade V2 Clips '95 - '97 (VHS: March 1, 1998, DVD: December 6, 2000)
 Siam Shade V3 (VHS: March 20, 1999, DVD: December 16, 2000)
 Siam Shade V4 Tour 1999 Monkey Science Final Yoyogi (VHS: August 30, 1999, DVD: September 22, 1999)
 Siam Shade V5 (September 6, 2000)
 Siam Shade V6 Live Otoko ki (December 31, 2000)
 Siam Shade V7 Live in Budokan Legend of Sanctuary (March 27, 2002) Oricon DVDs Ranking: No. 34
 Siam Shade V8 Start & Stand Up Live in Budokan 2002.03.10 (May 29, 2002) No. 14
 Siam Shade V9 The Perfect Clip (January 8, 2003) No. 49
 Siam Shade Spirits ~Return the Favor~ 2011.10.21 Saitama Super Arena (March 10, 2012)

References

Discographies of Japanese artists